Taffel is a surname. Notable people with the surname include:

 Alexander Taffel (died 1997), American school principal
 Bess Taffel (1913–2000), American screenwriter
 Frank Taffel (1877–1947), American journalist

German toponymic surnames
German-language surnames